"Kom ut som en stjärna" is a song by Swedish drag act After Dark. The song was released in Sweden as a digital download on 20 February 2016, and was written by Sven-Inge Sjöberg, Lennart Wastesson, Larry Forsberg, Lina Eriksson, Kent Olsson, and Calle Kindbom. It took part in Melodifestivalen 2016, and placed last in the third semi-final. The song was recorded in Swedish, with no English counterpart.

Charts

Release history

References

2015 songs
2016 singles
Melodifestivalen songs of 2016
After Dark (drag act) songs
Swedish pop songs
Swedish-language songs
LGBT-related songs
Songs written by Lina Eriksson
Songs written by Calle Kindbom
Warner Music Group singles